The Chevrolet Equinox is a series of crossover SUVs from Chevrolet introduced in 2004 for the 2005 model year. It replaces the North American Chevrolet Tracker and Chevrolet S-10 Blazer. The third-generation Equinox also replaced the first-generation Chevrolet Captiva.

A battery electric, or BEV version called the Equinox EV was introduced in 2022 with sales starting in 2023 for the 2024 model year. It adopts a separate design and underpinnings from the ICE-powered Equinox.



First generation (2005) 

The Chevrolet Equinox was introduced in 2004 for the 2005 model year. Originally, the Equinox was shown at the 2003 North American International Auto Show.

The Pontiac Torrent was introduced in 2005 for the 2006 model year. The Pontiac Torrent was originally shown at the 2005 Los Angeles Auto Show.

Riding on the GM Theta platform, the unibody is mechanically similar to the Saturn Vue and the Suzuki XL7. However, the Equinox and the Torrent are larger than the Vue, riding on a  wheelbase,  longer than the Vue. Front-wheel drive is standard, with optional all-wheel drive. They are not designed for serious off-roading like the truck-based Chevrolet Tahoe and Chevrolet TrailBlazer.

For the 2006 model year, GM updated the Equinox for the first time, adding GM badges on the front doors, as well as recoloring the dashboard panel from grey to black. For 2007, the instrument cluster got a redesign with a trip computer display, replacing the Saturn-sourced unit.

The first generation Equinox and Torrent were produced exclusively at the CAMI Automotive GM/Suzuki joint venture plant in Ingersoll, Ontario, Canada. The 3.4 L LNJ V6 engine is made in China (by Shanghai GM), while the Aisin AF33 transmission is made in Japan. Starting with the 2008 model year, the Equinox Sport and Pontiac GXP were available with a 3.6-liter V6 engine that was made in the United States.

Production ended in May 2009.

The Chevrolet Equinox was not sold in Mexico during the 2009 model year.

Pontiac Torrent 

While the Torrent shares its basic body structure and mechanicals with the Equinox, it does have a different front and rear styling.

The Torrent was discontinued after the 2009 model year as part of the discontinuation of the Pontiac brand, with the last one rolling off the assembly line on September 2, 2009. A Buick Theta crossover SUV was to be made, effectively taking place of the Pontiac Torrent. Instead, GM replaced the Torrent with the GMC Terrain, which shares the Theta platform with the second generation Equinox.

Engines

Sport trims 

For the 2008 and 2009 model years, GM offered different versions of the Equinox and Torrent; called Sport/SS and GXP, respectively. Featuring a 3.6-liter LY7 DOHC V6 engine and a 6-speed automatic transmission (with Manual Tap Up/Down shifting capability).

These models also received a  lowered ride height with a performance-tuned suspension and unique front and rear body kits. The lower stance is accented by the 18-inch 5-spoke chrome wheels and the absence of the roof rack, giving them a smoother design flow compared to the standard models. The GXP had twin hood scoops, hydraulic power-assisted steering (as opposed to the electric power-assisted standard Torrent), improved interior trim with unique gauges, and a dual chrome-tipped exhaust.

Optional features included navigation, heated sport leather seats, DVD entertainment system, a sunroof and all-wheel drive. GM stated the Equinox Sport was the first vehicle to reflect its more cautious naming standards. GM also prominently promoted the GXP in television advertisements by touting its horsepower advantage over the BMW X3, in an effort to brand Pontiac more as a direct, low-cost rival to BMW.

Equinox LTZ 

An Equinox LTZ model was added for the 2008 model year. It is differentiated by its 17-inch chrome-clad aluminium wheels, chrome door handles and chrome luggage rack side rail inserts. Standard interior features include heated front seats, leather seating inserts, head curtain side impact airbags, AM/FM stereo with six-disc in-dash CD changer and MP3 CD playback capability, and a Pioneer premium seven-speaker audio system. Equinox LTZ came with the same ride and handling package as LS and LT models.

Olympic-themed special editions 

For the 2008 model year, in tribute to the Vancouver 2010 Winter Olympic Games, the Equinox and Torrent each received a special edition; the Team Canada Edition and the Podium Edition, respectively. This package added chrome-clad wheels, sunroof, premium sound system, and special badging. These trims were sold only in Canada.

Second generation (2010) 

The second generation Equinox was announced by GM on December 21, 2008, and debuted at the 2009 North American International Auto Show in Detroit. The 2010 Equinox went on sale in June 2009. It is built on a stiffened version of the same "Theta" platform used in the previous model. The second generation Equinox was built with a pair of upgraded gasoline direct injection engines, with better fuel economy claimed by GM. Earlier 2010 models had the GM badges on the front doors, but were later deleted.

Marketing of Chevrolet Equinox resumed in Mexico in late November 2009, for the 2010 model year after a year of absence. Sales of the Chevrolet Equinox to Mexico were stopped after the 2011 model year. However, in October 2015 the Equinox was reintroduced in Mexico to replace the Captiva Sport for the 2016 model year.

The second generation Equinox is available standard with a 2.4-liter I4 engine produced in Tonawanda, New York and Spring Hill, Tennessee, with a 3.0-liter V6 engine is available as an option. Both powertrains contain six-speed automatics and optional all-wheel-drive systems, with front-wheel-drive being standard.

Model year changes

2013
This engine offered 14 percent more horsepower and 22 percent more torque than the previous 3.0-liter V-6, with the same EPA-estimated fuel economy. A new FE2 suspension package was offered, matched with the 3.6-liter V6 and packaged with 18-inch or 19-inch chrome-clad wheels on LTZ models. The 2013 model year introduced Chevrolet MyLink telematics system to the Equinox.

Additional new features for 2013 models included a dual-player DVD entertainment system, a Power convenience package, and a safety package with lane departure warning system, forward collision warning and rear park assist.

2014
For the 2014 model year, chrome-clad wheels became standard on LTZ models.

2015
The 2015 model year saw the addition of OnStar with 4G LTE and built-in Wi-Fi hotspot, which included a 3GB/three-month data trial, standard on LT and LTZ models, with navigation available on LTZ and 2LT.

2016
For 2016, the Chevrolet Equinox received its first mid-cycle refresh along with its cousin the GMC Terrain, which was unveiled at the 2015 Chicago Auto Show on February 12, 2015. This Equinox received a new grille, headlights and front fascia as well as reworked tail lights. In the interior, the Equinox gained a new gear selector, a second storage shelf underneath the dashboard, as well as deletion of the door lock buttons from the dashboard. A new level trim, L, was introduced as the base level, as LS was made the second level, followed by LT and another new trim Premier (replacing LTZ for 2017). Both LT1, LT2, and LTZ level trims were discontinued.

More features are in LTZ and LS trims, while LT is unchanged from 2015. However, the OnStar delete feature was removed along with the CD/AM/FM/MP3/WMA Playback audio system, the rear seat entertainment system and one set of 19-inch chrome wheels. In its place are the Chevrolet MyLink system that became standard on all trims and new 17- and 18-inch wheel trims.

Engines

EPA fuel economy ratings 
Skepticism about the Equinox's EPA fuel economy ratings has been raised after a number of road tests at the model's launch achieved 20 to 30% lower fuel economy than the official EPA ratings. After achieving  in a road test, Edmunds InsideLine stated, "...our testing didn't come close to achieving [the EPA's numbers], even though we're usually within 1 mpg of the EPA combined number." Car and Driver recorded another  figure and noted its "...fuel economy that won’t live up to the / EPA ratings in real-world use...". AutoWeek only averaged . The Truth About Cars published an editorial suggesting that GM "inflated" the Equinox's fuel economy ratings for public relations purposes and that the trip computer inaccurately reports fuel economy reported to the driver.

Motorweek, however, managed to achieve  with their test car during mixed driving. LeftlaneNews.com was also able to average  average in mixed city and highway driving.

Third generation (2018) 

Chevrolet unveiled the third-generation Equinox on September 22, 2016. Gasoline-powered variants of the 2018 Chevrolet Equinox went on sale in early 2017, while diesel-powered variants arrived in autumn 2017. This generation was developed as a smaller vehicle to align itself with other vehicles in the compact crossover SUV segment, with its former role occupied by the new Chevrolet Blazer.

The third-generation Equinox also introduced a new AWD system from GKN Driveline, which allows the driver to disengage the driveshaft to reduce friction and rotational inertia during the times when AWD is not needed.

New safety features introduced in the third-generation Equinox include a surround-view camera, forward collision warning, low-speed automatic braking, a Safety Alert Seat, as well as a Rear Seat Alert system, a feature first introduced on the 2017 GMC Acadia.

After the 2019 model year, Chevrolet planned to no longer AWD on the diesel-powered Equinox, due to low consumer demand. However, this change never took place as the diesel engine was discontinued entirely after the 2019 model year. The 2.0-liter LTG turbocharged inline-four was discontinued for the 2021 model year due to low consumer demand as it only represented for around 7 percent of all Equinox sales.

The Equinox was discontinued again in the Mexican market in July 2021 due to poor sales, being indirectly replaced by the Captiva, although it is still produced in Mexico for export markets.

Trim levels
The third generation Equinox is available in four trim levels: L, LS, LT, and Premier. The 1.5-liter turbo I4 is available on all trims. The 2.0-liter turbo I4 is available on LT and Premier. The 1.6-liter turbo-diesel was available on LT and Premier.

An appearance package was available as the Redline Edition. The Redline Edition was only available on the LT trim without the panoramic sunroof or diesel engine. The Redline Edition was available in October 2017.

The Midnight trim line went on sale in Mexico in September 2019.

Powertrain 
The third-generation Equinox is available with up to three engine choices. Gasoline engines are identical to the 2016 Malibu: a 1.5-liter turbocharged inline four-cylinder engine that produces  ( less than the 2.4-liter engine in the previous Equinox but more torque), a 2.0-liter turbocharged I4 engine that produces  ( less than the 3.6-liter V6 engine in the previous Equinox), or a 1.6-liter turbo-diesel I4 engine that produces . The 3.6-liter V6 engine option did not carry on to the third generation. The 2.0-liter unit will also be paired with a nine-speed automatic transmission.

2022 refresh
On February 6, 2020, Chevrolet unveiled a refreshed Equinox at the Chicago Auto Show. The updated vehicle sports a new front grille, which extends into the redesigned headlamps, along with a restyled lower fascia with different fog lamps. The rear also sees small changes in the way of redesigned tail lamps and a different bumper. 

The trim levels change slightly, with the RS joining the primary LS, LT, and Premier offerings. The sport/street-centric RS trim is set apart by its unique front and rear fascias, black exterior accents, black badges, “Dark Android” 19-inch wheels and quad-tip exhaust. Inside, the sport-inspired crossover features black upholstery with red contrasting stitching and an RS-branded shift knob. 

The base L trim level was dropped, making the LS trim level the base model. The Midnight, Sport, and Redline editions were also discontinued, all of which were replaced by the new RS trim level. The refreshed Equinox went on sale in the first quarter of 2021 as a 2022 model, as there is no demand to launch brand-new redesigned and facelifted vehicles in 2020 as 2021 MY vehicles due to effects from the coronavirus pandemic.

The 2022 model is only available with the 1.5-liter LYX turbo inline-four. The 2.0-liter LTG turbo inline-four will not return for the 2022 refresh. The 2023 model year only comes with the 1.5 liter LSD turbo inline-four.

Engines

Holden Equinox

Holden launched the Holden Equinox (EQ series) in Australia in November 2017, with the first cars arriving in Australia and New Zealand in December. It was available with a 1.5-liter turbocharged engine on the base LS and LS+ models, while the more potent 2.0-liter turbocharged model was available for all other models - LT, LTZ and LTZ-V. The 1.6-liter turbo-diesel engine launched in 2018. It was produced at GM's Ramos Arizpe assembly facility in Mexico, and replaced the Korean-built five-seat Captiva.

The Australasian Equinox was sold alongside the seven-seat Holden Acadia, known as the GMC Acadia in the Americas.

On October 17, 2018, Holden halted orders on the Equinox due to slow sales and unsold inventory at its dealerships. The Holden Equinox was discontinued in 2020, along with the rest of the Holden lineup, following GM's decision to terminate the marque in Australia and New Zealand and withdraw from all right-hand drive markets due to poor sales and adequate investments not being returned for demand and funding needed continue to serve and remain present in right-hand drive markets.

Safety
The 2022 Equinox was tested by the IIHS:

Equinox EV 

The battery electric version of the Equinox was introduced in January 2022 in a set of artist impression images at the 2022 Consumer Electronics Show (CES) and will go on sale in the fall of 2023 for the 2024 model year. It received a completely separate design and underpinnings to the ICE-powered Equinox. The vehicle will be equipped with GM Ultium batteries shared with other GM battery electric vehicles.

Fuel cell version 

The Chevrolet Equinox Fuel Cell Vehicle uses hydrogen for fuel with water as its only exhaust. The Equinox Fuel Cell uses the fourth-generation hydrogen technology found in the Chevrolet Sequel concept, which was unveiled in September 2009. The fuel cell is designed for only  of driving, but is engineered to be operable in subfreezing temperatures throughout its life. GM states that the Equinox Fuel Cell is about  heavier than the original Equinox and has one inch less ground clearance. To reduce weight, it has aluminum doors and a carbon fiber hood. It uses headlights from the Pontiac Torrent.

A dashboard mounted screen calculates the fuel savings to that of a gasoline-powered Equinox. It also includes a kilowatt meter and a fuel cell energy display. The fuel cell has four vapor outlets that replace the exhaust pipe. The Equinox Fuel Cell is certified by the EPA as a zero-emission vehicle (ZEV). GM built 115 Chevrolet Equinox Fuel Cell vehicles and deployed them in 2007–2008 in several target areas including New York and California as part of a comprehensive plan dubbed "Project Driveway".

The Equinox Fuel Cell includes safety features such as ABS, traction control system, and GM's OnStar telematics service, which offers drivers advice on operating the cars as well as information on nearby hydrogen filling stations. The car meets all 2007 federal safety standards.

Performance 
Motor Trend assessed the vehicle's performance as nearly the same as the 3.6-liter gasoline-powered equivalent, while bemoaning the dearth of high-pressure hydrogen filling stations near Riverside, California, in 2008.

Natural gas version
In 2013, Nat G CNG Solutions and AGA Systems announced that they had begun offering a Compressed Natural Gas (CNG) version of the Chevy Equinox and the GMC Terrain using the 2.4-liter direct-injected engine. The natural gas version is a "bi-fuel" CNG vehicle, meaning that it can run on either gasoline or natural gas, giving it extended range. The Terrain/Equinox were the first direct-injection natural gas vehicles ever approved by the US EPA.

Silver Eagle Distributors, a distributor of Anheuser-Busch products, was the launch customer for the natural gas version with an initial order of up to 100 of the natural gas GMC Terrains. CenterPoint Energy was an early customer of the natural gas Chevy Equinox.

CNG configurations 
The CNG version was available as a newly purchased Equinox through select dealers or as a retrofit on 2013 and 2014 models. Nat G CNG Solutions offered the vehicle in two options: a two-seater "cargo version" and a five-seat "passenger version." The cargo version has an 837-mile combined gasoline / natural gas (9.2 gge of CNG) while the passenger version has a 775-mile combined highway range (6.8 gge of CNG).

Emissions and performance 
The companies claimed that the natural gas version had tested at the EPA lab at  highway on natural gas and had achieved a Bin 3 emissions equivalent to the Toyota Prius.

Electric conversion 

Amp Electric Vehicles sells an all-electric conversion of the Chevrolet Equinox. They have sold their first electric Equinox to Dayton Power & Light, and had a five-year, thousand-SUV order from Northern Lights Energy in Iceland.

Sales

Equinox

Pontiac Torrent

References

External links

 

2000s cars
2010s cars
2020s cars
All-wheel-drive vehicles
Cars introduced in 2004
Equinox
Crossover sport utility vehicles
Front-wheel-drive vehicles
Fuel cell vehicles
Compact sport utility vehicles